Opogodo is a village in Condoto Municipality, Chocó Department in Colombia.

Climate
Opogodo has an extremely wet tropical rainforest climate (Af).

References

Populated places in the Chocó Department